One America News Network (OANN), also known as One America News (OAN), is a far-right, pro-Trump cable news channel founded by Robert Herring Sr. and owned by Herring Networks, Inc., that launched on July 4, 2013. The network is headquartered in San Diego, California, and operates news bureaus in Washington, D.C., and New York City.

The company said in 2019 OANN was available in 35 million homes and that its audience ranged from 150,000 to as large as 500,000, though that year Nielsen Media Research estimated its viewership to be about 14,000. By July 2022, the network was available only to a few hundred thousand people who subscribed to smaller cable providers.

In October 2021, Robert Herring Sr. testified in court that the network was created at the urging of executives of AT&T, which through its subsidiary DirecTV has since been the source of up to 90% of the network's revenues.

The network's prime-time political talk shows have a conservative perspective, and the channel has described itself as one of the "greatest supporters" of Donald Trump. Trump himself has promoted both the network and some of its hosts. The channel is known for promoting falsehoods and conspiracy theories.

History 
OANN was announced on March 14, 2013, by Herring Networks, Inc., an independent media company founded in 2003 by conservative businessman Robert Herring, Sr. The OANN channel originally debuted in partnership with The Washington Times, a conservative daily newspaper founded by the Unification Church from South Korea. Herring said in 2013 that under OANN's agreement with The Washington Times, the new network could use any Times content, but was not obligated to do so; he also said at the time that between 60 and 65 Herring Broadcasting employees spent "most of their days" on One America.

Reuters reported in October 2021 that it had reviewed court documents showing the network was created in 2013 at the urging of executives of AT&T, which has since been the source of up to 90% of the network's revenues. In a 2020 deposition, a company accountant testified that lacking a contract with AT&T subsidiary DirecTV, the network's value "would be zero." Court documents showed the network promised to "cast a positive light" on AT&T during newscasts.

In July 2014, OANN relocated its news and production studios from the Washington Times building to 101 Constitution Avenue NW, near the Capitol.

Herring told the 2013 Conservative Political Action Conference that "Fox News has done a great job serving the center-right and independent audiences", but that the audience's alternative news sources lacked variety.

At the beginning of 2020, it was reported that Trump allies were looking into purchasing OANN.

In November 2020, YouTube suspended OANN for one week and ended its ability to monetize its existing content as a first strike under its three-strike community guideline violation policy for advertising a false cure for COVID-19.

As of April 2021, its YouTube channel had close to 1.5 million subscribers. Approximately 150 employees worked at its San Diego headquarters.

In August 2021, the channel was sued by Dominion Voting Systems and Smartmatic for promoting false claims that the companies had engaged in election fraud during the 2020 presidential election.

DirecTV said in January 2022 that it would not renew the contract with Herring Networks, which expired in April 2022, affecting One America News Network and its sister channel AWE, which would be removed from DirecTV's satellite and U-verse TV services. The channels were dropped from on DirecTV on April 4, 2022; some staff members left the network for other employment.

Verizon Fios, OANN's largest remaining carrier, notified its customers on July 21, 2022, that it could not come to terms to renew its contract with OANN and would remove the network from its service in nine days. August 1, 2022 was OANN's final day on cable or satellite, marking the end of OANN's availability on major carriers. OANN commentator Pearson Sharp said on-air that OANN was dropped because Verizon is a "radical Marxist" corporation.

Programming 
, shows airing on OANN include: Real America with Dan Ball, In Focus with Addison Smith, and Tipping Point.

In August 2014, OANN launched the show On Point with Tomi Lahren. Many clips from the program went viral, and by 2015 Lahren had gained widespread attention for her commentaries. On August 19, 2015, Lahren aired her final show at OANN. On the week of August 24, 2015 former Republican vice presidential candidate Sarah Palin guest-hosted a program on the network.

In 2019, the channel aired the Canadian television film Claws of the Red Dragon, which had signed Steve Bannon as its American distributor.

Content 
OANN is known for its pro-Donald Trump content, promotion of conspiracy theories such as election tampering in November 2020, and criticisms of mainstream media. OANN has described itself as one of the "greatest supporters" of Trump. It has been described as a political propaganda outlet.

Pro-Trump content 

OANN is pro-Trump. The father of Charles Herring, Robert Herring Sr., founder and CEO of the network, has ordered producers to promote pro-Trump stories, anti-Clinton stories, and anti-abortion stories and to minimize stories about Russian interference in the 2016 presidential election. Herring prohibited the network from running stories about polls that did not show Trump in the lead during the 2016 election.

During the 2016 presidential campaign, the channel ran a special titled Betrayal at Benghazi: The Cost of Hillary Clinton's Dereliction and Greed. Herring, the owner of the channel, sent his producers a report that falsely claimed that Hillary Clinton had a brain tumor and asking them to check up on it. He also shared a report with producers claiming that Planned Parenthood had promoted abortion and ordered them to minimize coverage of Pope Francis's US visit owing to the Pope's calls for action on global warming. Herring also repeatedly ordered his producers not to cover stories pertaining to Russian interference in the 2016 presidential election.

According to former and current employees at the channel as well as internal e-mails, by July 2017 the executives of the channel had directed the channel to "scuttle stories about police shootings, encourage antiabortion stories, minimize coverage of Russian aggression, and steer away from the new president's troubles."

In October 2017, the channel claimed without evidence that a "report" had been published that showed "U.K. Crime Rises 13% Annually Amid Spread of Radical Islamic Terror". Trump later repeated this falsehood, suggesting that he learned of it from OANN.

In June 2017, OANN was granted a permanent seat in the White House's James Brady briefing room. The network's Chief White House Correspondent, Trey Yingst, was one of the top five most called-upon reporters covering the Trump administration. Trump has been repeatedly called for questions from OANN during press conferences, including in February 2017 when Yingst asked the president about his campaign's contacts with the Russian government. Also in February 2017, OANN was invited to a network lunch with Trump. In August 2017, Trump praised OANN, saying: "It's a great network". In response, OANN CEO Robert Herring said that OANN considers itself a tough but fair presence in the White House press corps.

OANN supported the Trump administration's revocation of CNN reporter Jim Acosta's press credentials; most major media outlets, including the conservative Fox News, opposed this decision. In a statement, Robert Herring attacked Fox News, saying he "can't believe Fox is on the other side."

Rudy Giuliani has promoted conspiracy theories related to the Trump–Ukraine scandal on OANN.

On January 12, 2020, an OANN broadcast promoted debunked conspiracy theories alleging illegal wiretapping of Trump. OANN broadcasts all of Trump's speeches uninterrupted.

In August 2020, OANN tweeted a promotion for a television segment entitled "America Under Siege: The Attempt to Overthrow President Trump." The tweet asserted that ongoing demonstrations in the aftermath of the George Floyd killing constituted a "coup attempt" that was "led by a well funded network of anarchists trying to take down the President." Trump retweeted the message.

On February 11, 2021, after Trump had left office, OANN aired a "tribute to his accomplishments" set to a reading of Rudyard Kipling's poem "If—". The video was credited to Harrison Hill Smith, an InfoWars contributor.

Murder of Seth Rich conspiracy theories 
OANN has promoted conspiracy theories about the murder of Seth Rich.

Roy Moore sexual misconduct report controversy 

After The Washington Post reported in November 2017 allegations that Alabama Senate candidate Roy Moore had made unwanted sexual advances toward teenagers when he was in his thirties, OANN "became a source of both positive coverage and stories that could cast doubt on his accusers." In November 2017, OANN aired a segment citing a false rumor by an anonymous Twitter account that The Washington Post had offered $1,000 to Roy Moore's accusers. OANN described the tweet as a "report" and described the tweeter as a "former Secret Service agent and Navy veteran". The Twitter source had a history of tweeting falsehoods and conspiracy theories; the Twitter account had also made repeated and inconsistent lies about its identity, including appropriating the identity of a Navy serviceman who died in 2007. After it was revealed that the story was a hoax, OANN did not retract its report.

During his Senate campaign, Roy Moore cited OANN when he defended himself against the accusations, including an OANN story that alleged his "Accusers Have Ties to Drug Dealers & Washington Post".

During the night of the Alabama Senate election, OANN announced that Moore had swept the election "by a large margin" when in actuality Moore had lost the race. In its announcement, the network cited "unofficial polling", and the news anchor extended OANN CEO Robert Herring's congratulations to Moore on having run a "fine campaign." OANN's website also published an erroneous article claiming Moore had won "despite attacks from Democrats about unverified allegations." During election night, OANN also reported "a number of people have been caught trying to sneak into voting booths and vote illegally"; however, Alabama Secretary of State's office said it had no credible reports of voter fraud.

Conspiracy theory about David Hogg 

In February 2018, one of the hosts on OANN tweeted a conspiracy theory that David Hogg, a 17-year-old survivor of the Stoneman Douglas High School shooting, had been coached to speak against Trump by, and was "running cover" for, his retired FBI agent father. Donald Trump Jr. "liked" the OANN host's tweet. The younger Hogg responded, describing the conspiracy theory to BuzzFeed News as "immature, rude, and inhuman."

Syria chemical attack 
In April 2018, while on an al-Assad regime-led tour of the area of the Douma chemical attack, an OANN correspondent claimed there was no evidence that a chemical attack had occurred. The correspondent said, "Not one of the people that I spoke to in that neighborhood said that they had seen anything or heard anything about a chemical attack on that day" and that residents "loved Bashar al-Assad."

In May 2019, OANN published a report claiming that the White Helmets had admitted to staging fake chemical weapons attacks intended to put blame on the Assad regime. OANN referred to the humanitarian organization, which is partly funded by the US State Department, as "terrorist-linked". The Daily Beast characterized this story as a "smear" that could be traced directly as Russian disinformation.

Conspiracy theorist Jack Posobiec 
Far-right conspiracy theorist Jack Posobiec was employed by OANN as a political correspondent from 2018 to 2021. Posobiec was a prominent proponent of the Pizzagate and murder of Seth Rich conspiracy theories.

In September 2018, Posobiec interviewed a pro-Hitler online poster known as Microchip on OANN without indicating that person's affiliations, according to the Southern Poverty Law Center. The SPLC said the two men had worked together in spreading disinformation for several years, including the false claims propagated in Pizzagate. In 2020, during the George Floyd protests in Buffalo, New York, Posobiec falsely reported and promoted another unsubstantiated conspiracy theory regarding pipe bombs.

False story about Bible ban 
In April 2018, OANN ran a segment falsely claiming that a California bill would ban the sale of Bibles. Within 24 hours, the OANN video was viewed 1.4 million times on Facebook. Snopes determined that this claim was a misrepresentation; the bill actually targeted gay conversion therapy.

Unsubstantiated claims about Ammar Campa-Najjar 
During the mid-term campaign for the November 2018 U.S. elections, OANN ran a segment claiming that Democratic congressional candidate Ammar Campa-Najjar's father "praised the deaths" of members of the Israeli Olympic team in the 1972 Munich massacre. The Washington Post fact-checker noted that there was no attribution to this statement in the OANN segment. An OANN commentator also claimed that groups connected to the Muslim Brotherhood donated to Campa-Najjar's campaign. The Washington Post fact-checker said it "couldn't find evidence of this after searching Campa-Najjar's filings with the Federal Election Commission." Nevertheless, the OANN segment was used in attack ads by Campa-Najjar's Republican opponent Duncan D. Hunter to support the false suggestion that Campa-Najjar was tied to terrorism. Hunter won in the general election.

Interview subject with a pseudonym 
In July 2019, the network interviewed pro-Trump activist Logan Cook, known online as Carpe Donktum, about allegations of anti-conservative bias on Reddit. OANN identified the man as Dennis F. Charles and said he was "a conservative social media analyst." OANN did not disclose that Cook was using a pseudonym.

Russia 

OANN is known for downplaying threats posed to the United States by Russia. According to a former OANN producer, on his first day at OANN he was told, "Yeah, we like Russia here." One of OANN's reporters, Kristian Brunovich Rouz, simultaneously works for the Russian propaganda outlet and news agency Sputnik, which is state-owned; when Rouz runs favorable segments on OANN that relate to Russia, OANN does not disclose that he also works for Sputnik. Rouz compiled a wholly fabricated story that OANN ran in 2017, which alleged that Hillary Clinton's political action committee secretly gave $800,000 to "antifa." In May 2020, Rouz created a segment for OANN in which he claimed "mounting evidence of a globalist conspiracy" involving the Clintons, Soros, Bill Gates, Anthony Fauci, and the Chinese government. No evidence exists for any of this.

In September 2019, OANN parent Herring Networks sued MSNBC host Rachel Maddow (as well as Comcast, MSNBC and NBCUniversal Media) for $10 million in federal court, after Maddow said the network "literally [is] paid Russian propaganda" on her July 22, 2019 program (when she referred to a Daily Beast article identifying Rouz as working for Sputnik). The court dismissed the suit, finding the claim was not defamation, but that a "reasonable viewer" would recognize it as a reasonable summation of the article published by The Daily Beast. In February 2021, Herring Networks was ordered to pay Maddow and MSNBC $250,000 legal fees in an anti-SLAPP ruling. OANN's appeal of the ruling was denied by a three-judge panel of the Ninth Circuit Court of Appeals in August 2021. The panel decided that Maddow's statement was "an obvious exaggeration, cushioned within an undisputed news story", and thus not defamation.

Chanel Rion
In 2019, OANN hired Chanel Rion as a correspondent. Rion previously worked as a political cartoonist, promoted murder of Seth Rich conspiracy theories, and wrote an anti-feminist children's book; Rion also praised a book by a Holocaust denier. In October 2019, she claimed without evidence that former FBI lawyer Lisa Page and former FBI Deputy Director Andrew McCabe were involved in an affair. OANN later retracted the story.

In January 2020, OANN named Rion its chief White House correspondent. In April 2020, Rion was expelled from the White House Correspondents' Association and her formal seat was removed for flagrantly violating newly implemented social distancing rules in the James S. Brady Press Briefing Room. Despite this, Rion has boasted she was personally invited to attend by the Trump White House's press secretary, Stephanie Grisham, a day after the ban.

False claims about George Soros 
OANN has run stories falsely claiming that George Soros, a Hungarian-born American philanthropist, collaborated with the Nazis when he was a 14-year-old. The network has also accused Soros of funding migrant caravans to the United States.

During a report from Ukraine with Rudy Giuliani, in December 2019, OANN correspondent Chanel Rion claimed without evidence that Soros had shown up at the Kyiv airport with "human Dobermans in little black Mercedes" to find them. The claim was ridiculed in Ukrainian and American media. Soros was not known to have visited Ukraine since 2016.

COVID-19 pandemic conspiracy theories 

OANN has promoted hydroxychloroquine as a "miracle cure" for COVID-19, blaming a "massive disinformation campaign" by "Big Tech" and the "Chinese-controlled" World Health Organization for it not being recommended as such.

In March 2020, during the COVID-19 pandemic, the OANN chief White House correspondent Chanel Rion promoted a conspiracy theory that the virus originated in a North Carolina lab, citing information from a "citizen investigator and a monitored source amongst a certain set of the DC intelligence community" who was actually a Twitter conspiracy theorist. As she described this individual during a televised report from the White House grounds, an image was displayed of actor Keir Dullea in the film 2001: A Space Odyssey. She also asserted that Anthony Fauci, the nation's leading expert on infectious diseases, had funded the creation of COVID-19. Rion later claimed without evidence that other mainstream media outlets were parroting Chinese Communist Party propaganda. During a press conference with Trump, she asked him whether it was "racist" to use the term "Chinese food"; accused "major left-wing news media" of "consistently siding with foreign state propaganda, Islamic radicals and Latin gangs and cartels" as well as "Chinese Communist Party narratives"; and asked the president whether it was "alarming" that media "work right here at the White House with direct access to you and your team?"

In May 2020, OANN host Liz Wheeler claimed without evidence that "mainstream media pretended there was a deadly surge in COVID cases" after the 2020 Wisconsin Spring election. PolitiFact rated the claim "Pants on Fire", having found that there were no references to a "surge" in their review of state and national articles about the election, and that reports had accurately listed the number of COVID-19 cases potentially related to the election.

In November 2020, YouTube suspended OANN's channel's ability to upload videos for one week and demonetized its channel for violating YouTube's policy against promoting COVID-19 misinformation, after OANN uploaded a video advertising a fake cure for COVID-19. OANN responded that "The video was 'unlisted' on YouTube for review by internal OAN staff only", accused YouTube of a First Amendment violation, and stated that the video was republished on the OANN website.

In September 2022, OANN reported on a declaration by a group of scientists and doctors claiming that the COVID-19 vaccines were causing an "international medical crisis". The fact-checking website Health Feedback noted that OANN did not acknowledge that the claims made in the declaration had previously been fact-checked and found to be inaccurate, unsupported or misleading.

George Floyd protests 

In June 2020, during protests against racism and police brutality in the wake of the murder of George Floyd, OANN reporter Jack Posobiec falsely claimed that there were pipe bombs planted at the Korean War Memorial in Washington D.C., and that "federal assets [were] in pursuit". There were no pipe bombs, nor is there any evidence that any "federal assets" pursued it.

Buffalo police shoving incident

In June 2020, OANN claimed, without evidence, that an elderly protester who had been seriously injured by police "was attempting to capture the radio communications signature of Buffalo police officers" and was linked to the antifa movement. Referencing OANN's unfounded conspiracy theory, Trump later tweeted that the protester "could be an ANTIFA provocateur." OANN's Kristian Rouz provided no evidence for these claims, referring only to The Conservative Treehouse, an anonymously written right-wing blog. That afternoon, Herring Sr. tweeted to Trump, "we won't let you down as your source for credible news!" On June 13, protesters in San Diego, California gathered outside OANN headquarters, where Herring Sr. challenged the crowd to prove the story was false.

2020 US presidential election 

In the months after the 2020 United States presidential election, OANN extensively amplified false claims of election fraud and promoted conspiracy theories related to the election. Five days after the Associated Press had called the election for Joe Biden, OANN continued to insist that Donald Trump had won, and OANN continued to refer to Trump as "President Trump" (while referring to Biden as simply "Biden" or "Joe Biden") for months after the January 2021 inauguration of Joe Biden as President. Christina Bobb, an OANN news anchor, was present in the Willard Hotel "command center" where top Trump associates worked to prevent Joe Biden's election from being certified. The Washington Post reported in January 2022 that Bobb worked with Rudy Giuliani and other Trump campaign officials in December 2020 to execute a plan for Republicans in seven states to create fraudulent certificates of ascertainment to falsely assert Trump had been reelected.

OANN saw growth in its audience as a result of its election coverage. It was boosted in particular by Donald Trump, who expressed disapproval of Fox News' reporting on the presidential election and encouraged his supporters to instead watch OANN or Newsmax TV, another conservative channel promoting election falsehoods.

Reuters reported in October 2021 that on the day of the attack on the Capitol by Trump supporters, an OANN news director emailed staff: "Please DO NOT say 'Trump Supporters Storm Capitol...' Simply call them demonstrators or protestors...DO NOT CALL IT A RIOT!!!" The next day, Herring emailed news producers: "We want to report all the things Antifa did yesterday. I don’t think it was Trump people but lets investigate." The FBI has not found evidence of antifa involvement.

Dominion Voting Systems

OANN was a major promoter of the conspiracy theory that Dominion Voting Systems had manipulated vote totals to ensure the victory of Democratic candidate Joe Biden. OANN spent months alleging manipulation by Dominion, advanced claims that Dominion employees had colluded with Antifa activists, aired a fictitious map allegedly seized by the US Army from election servers in Germany showing Donald Trump had received 410 electoral votes, and hosted interviews with Trump allies claiming that Dominion was part of an international communist conspiracy. Some of these claims were later amplified by Donald Trump, including a false assertion made on OANN that millions of votes for Trump were switched to votes for Joe Biden (a claim that originated on TheDonald.win, a pro-Trump website); Trump also tweeted out an OANN segment in which Ron Watkins, a far-right conspiracy theorist and administrator of 8chan (the website famous for its close connection to the QAnon conspiracy theory), was falsely characterized as an expert on election issues as he promoted conspiracy theories about Dominion.

OANN later removed all references to Dominion and Smartmatic, another company falsely accused of voter fraud, from its website without issuing public retractions after Dominion filed a $1.3 billion defamation lawsuit against Sidney Powell. However, on February 5, 2021, OANN aired Absolute Proof, a film produced by My Pillow CEO Mike Lindell that contained false claims and conspiracy theories about voter fraud in the election. Before the program, OANN showed a lengthy disclaimer asserting that the claims were Lindell's alone, but that the 2020 election results "remain disputed and questioned by millions of Americans." The disclaimer was seen as an attempt to avoid litigation from Dominion and Smartmatic.

On August 10, 2021, Dominion sued OANN for "knowingly and continuously" spreading false election fraud narratives, for a minimum of $1.6 billion.

Russian disinformation

On January 25, 2020, OANN aired a film titled The Ukraine Hoax: Impeachment, Biden Cash, and Mass Murder. In March 2021, the United States intelligence community released an analysis which found that proxies of Russian intelligence "made contact with established US media figures and helped produce a documentary that aired on a US television network in late January 2020" as part of a broad effort to promote and launder misleading or unsubstantiated narratives about Joe Biden "to US media organizations, US officials, and prominent US individuals, including some close to former President Trump and his administration."

Promotion of executions
In June 2021, OANN personality Pearson Sharp falsely stated in an on-air monologue that "the simple facts point to massive and widespread problems with voting integrity" and "there have been numerous indications that foreign governments including China and Pakistan, meddled in our election to install Joe Biden as president," continuing:
What are the consequences for traitors who meddled with our sacred democratic process and tried to steal power by taking away the voices of the American people? What happens to them? Well, in the past, America had a very good solution for dealing with such traitors: Execution...The bottom line is that no one is above the law. And let this be a warning to anyone who thinks they are. The consequences are clear. And those responsible will be brought to justice for their role in undermining America's democracy.

Followers of the QAnon conspiracy theory shared video of the monologue, which buttressed their belief that a "storm" was coming in which Satan-worshiping pedophiles who oppose Trump would be rounded up and executed.

Arizona election audit
Trump lost Arizona and its most populous county, Maricopa, in the 2020 election. Arizona Senate Republicans, holding the senate majority and led by Karen Fann, asserted possible fraud and hired private firms to conduct an audit of Maricopa balloting. OANN broadcast extensive coverage of the audit, which was widely criticized across the political spectrum. Bobb and Rion formed a 501(c)(4) social welfare organization to raise funds for the effort, promoting it on the air. The audit ultimately found no proof of fraud and that Biden's margin of victory was actually slightly higher.

Doxing and harassment of New York Times journalist 
On March 18, 2021, OANN aired a segment which contained the phone number of New York Times reporter Rachel Abrams, who they claimed was "fishing for information" from disgruntled OANN employees for a "hit piece" and called on viewers to "stand up to intimidation by the left" by contacting Abrams. OANN also posted a tweet with the number on its Twitter account, which was deleted after more than 6 hours by Twitter for violating its rules on personal and private information. On April 18, 2021, Abrams published an article in The New York Times, which cited interviews with current and former OANN employees stating that the channel had broadcast reports they considered to be "misleading, inaccurate or untrue", and that some employees were hoping the channel would be sued by Dominion Voting Systems, which it later was. Marty Golingan, one of the employees who was interviewed, was fired by OANN after the article was published.

Reception 
In March 2015, University of Southern California media professor Marty Kaplan praised the network for its focus on what he viewed as impartial news reporting, writing in The Huffington Post, "Ten minutes of OAN tells me eight stories; 10 minutes of Fox or MSNBC tells me one story, to make me mad," while commenting that OANN's opinion segments were "as delusional and incendiary as anything on conservative talk radio or Fox." He has since expressed a different view of the network, telling Columbia Journalism Review that, where once the talk shows were "sand traps" in a "large field of green", the network "fairly quickly" became "more like the Sahara". Don Kaplan (no relation to Marty) of the New York Daily News echoed similar sentiments to Marty Kaplan's initial view, writing in December 2016 that, "it's by far one of the most fair news outlets around, serving up a daily diet of ad-free, non-ideological, nonstop news—without smirking, snarky anchors or much fanfare" while stating that its opinion segments "skew hard to the right."

In July 2017, Marc Fisher wrote in The Washington Post that the network was "a reliably sympathetic voice of the [Trump] administration's goals and actions". In July 2018, Media Matters for America criticized OANN host Liz Wheeler for advancing conspiracy theories relating to the Planned Parenthood 2015 undercover videos controversy and other abortion topics and tying tangentially related news stories to the "so-called liberal hypocrisy on abortion." In 2019, the English Wikipedia deprecated OANN, along with The Gateway Pundit and The Daily Caller, with the consensus for OANN being that it publishes "falsehoods, conspiracy theories, and intentionally misleading stories".

In an April 2020 Last Week Tonight segment, John Oliver called the channel "a combination of far-right wing talking points and dirt-stupid reporting," criticizing its hosts, methods, ideology, accuracy, promotion of unfounded conspiracy theories, and closeness to the Trump administration.

Ratings 
In June 2019, OANN said it was available in 35 million homes and its audience ranged from 150,000 to as large as 500,000, though Nielsen Media Research estimated its viewership that year to be about 14,000. The company does not subscribe to Nielsen, citing its high fees, so regular audience estimates are not available.

Litigation 
In February 2021, a federal judge awarded $250,000 to MSNBC in an anti-SLAPP counter suit to OANN's $10million lawsuit claiming that they had been defamed by Rachel Maddow. The judgement ruled that OANN's initial suit was frivolous and required OANN to pay all legal fees incurred by MSNBC.

In December 2021, former Georgia election workers Ruby Freeman and her daughter Wandrea "Shaye" Moss filed a defamation lawsuit against OANN and several of its senior executives, among others. In the complaint, Freeman and Moss claimed that OANN broadcast stories which falsely accused them of conspiring to produce secret batches of illegal ballots and inserting them into the voting machines to help Joe Biden win the 2020 US presidential election. Due to the alleged false accusations, Freeman and Moss claimed that they "have become the objects of vitriol, threats, and harassment". In April 2022, they reached a settlement agreement with OANN and weeks later the network aired a pre-recorded 30-second segment acknowledging that its allegations were false.

See also

 Cyberwarfare by Russia
 List of conspiracy theories

References

External links 

2013 establishments in California
24-hour television news channels in the United States
American companies established in 2013
American conservative websites
Companies based in San Diego
Conservative media in the United States
Conspiracist media
English-language television stations in the United States
Far-right organizations in the United States
Television channels and stations established in 2013
Television networks in the United States